The Telegraph, for most of its existence known as the Nashua Telegraph, is a daily newspaper in Nashua, New Hampshire. It was founded as the Nashua Daily Telegraph in 1869, although a weekly version dates back to 1832. Through the 2000s it was the second-largest newspaper in the state in terms of daily print circulation, behind the New Hampshire Union Leader of Manchester.

In 2020 The Telegraph reduced its print run to Saturday only, when it produces a weekend edition under the Sunday Telegraph banner. In the announcement, the paper said it will continue to report news for its website every day.

After being family-owned for a century, The Telegraph was bought in the 1980s by Independent Publications of Bryn Mawr, Pennsylvania, which owned several smaller daily and weekly newspapers around the United States as well as some other businesses. In 2005, the paper's owner bought the Cabinet Press, publisher of weekly newspapers based in nearby Milford, New Hampshire. In April 2013, it was bought by Ogden Newspapers of Wheeling, West Virginia.

1980 presidential primary debate 

On February 23, 1980, the Telegraph received national attention during the New Hampshire presidential primary, when it hosted a Republican debate paid for by the campaign of former California Governor Ronald Reagan.  During a discussion over which candidates should be allowed to participate, Telegraph editor Jon Breen (1935–2017), acting as moderator, ordered sound man Bob Molloy to shut off Reagan's microphone, which was met with shouts of protest from the audience; Molloy refused to comply. Mispronouncing his name, Reagan rebuked Breen saying, "I am paying for this microphone, Mr. Green!" [sic], which was cheered by the audience and applauded by most of his fellow opponents. The phrase entered the political lexicon and the publicity helped to boost Reagan's successful run for the presidency.

Reagan later recounted the incident as a "brief and seemingly small event, one lasting only a few seconds", that he said he thought, "helped take me to the White House". He continues:

Arriving at the debate, Reagan found two seats prepared, one each for himself and for Bush on either side of Breen. The other candidates were confused, as was the audience.

See also 

 List of newspapers in New Hampshire

References

External links

Newspapers published in New Hampshire
Nashua, New Hampshire
Hudson, New Hampshire
Hillsborough County, New Hampshire
Publications established in 1832
1832 establishments in New Hampshire